The Grasshopper is a 1955 Soviet drama film directed by Samson Samsonov based on a short story of the same title by Anton Chekhov. It was nominated for a BAFTA award for Best Film in 1957.

The lead character is said to be based on Sofia Kuvshinnikova who although married to another was until 1890 living with the painter Isaac Levitan in the town of Plyos where Sofia was improving her painting skills. 

Chekhov wrote The Grasshopper shortly after this time when the couple had returned. Chekhov was a close friend of Sofia's  and may have had strong affections for her. The story was a way of criticizing her betrayal, both of him and her innocent husband, and created a small scandal. According to the memoirs of Chekhov's brother, Mikhail, the situation almost led to a duel with Levitan, but it was avoided thanks to the intercession of a mutual friend, Tatiana Shchepkina-Kupernik.

Cast
 Sergey Bondarchuk as Dr. Osip Stepanovich Dymov (as S. Bondarchuk)
 Lyudmila Tselikovskaya as Olga Ivanovna Dymova (as L. Tselikovskaya)
 Vladimir Druzhnikov as Ryabovskiy (as V. Druzhnikov)
 Evgeniy Teterin as Dr. Fedor Lukich Korostylev (as Ye. Teterin)
 Anatoli Aleksin
 Anatoliy Bobrovsky
 Vasili Bokarev as Bryndin (as V. Bokarev)
 Georgiy Georgiu as Uzdechkin (as G. Georgiu)
 Mikhail Gluzsky as Burkin (as M. Gluzskiy)

References

External links

1955 films
1955 drama films
Mosfilm films
Films based on works by Anton Chekhov
1950s Russian-language films
Soviet drama films